Araköy is a village in the central district of Şırnak Province in Turkey. The village is populated by Kurds of the Berwarî tribe and had a population of 596 in 2021.

The village was depopulated in the 1990s during the Kurdish–Turkish conflict.

References 

Kurdish settlements in Şırnak Province
Villages in Şırnak District